The Matewan Historic District encompasses the town center of the rural coal mining community of Matewan, West Virginia.  Matewan was the scene of the Battle of Matewan on May 19, 1920, during a coal miners' strike, an event which led to the Battle of Blair Mountain, the largest insurrection ever associated with the labor movement in the United States, and was depicted in the film Matewan.  It was designated a National Historic Landmark in 1997.

Description
Matewan is located on the banks of the Tug Fork, a tributary of the Big Sandy River in mountainous western West Virginia.  The hills rise steeply above the river, and the town center is located in a segment of flood plain on the north bank.  It is bounded on the west by a 20th-century concrete bridge, and on the east by Mate Creek.  There are two main roads, Mate Street (West Virginia Highway 49) and Main Street, with McCoy Alley paralleling Main Street between it and the river. Main Street and Mate Street are separated by a row of commercial buildings and by the right-of-way of the Norfolk Southern Railway.  This basic layout is unchanged since the historic events of the 1920s, although the bridge is a replacement and the railroad bed has been raised.  The row of commercial buildings are mainly vernacular early 20th-century buildings, most of which were standing at the time.  A few historically significant buildings have been lost, including that housing the Urias Hotel, headquarters of the Baldwin–Felts Detective Agency operatives.

History

In the early 20th century, Matewan was essentially a company town, in which the owners of the coal mines controlled many aspects of the lives of the miners they employed.  In a response to efforts by the United Mine Workers of America to unionize the miners in the region, the owners hired detectives of the Baldwin-Felts Agency to evict the families of striking workers from their company-owned housing.  In Matewan, this effort was resisted by the chief of police, Sid Hatfield, who objected to the presence of armed detectives in the town.  In a standoff on May 19, 1920, shots were fired, and the ensuing shootout resulted in the deaths of 10 men: seven detectives, two miners, and Matewan's mayor.  The event served to greatly heighten tensions, and prompted many miners to join the union.  The miners' actions culminated in the September 1921 Battle of Blair Mountain, which was ended by the intervention of federal troops.  It was the most violent act of labor violence in United States history.

Gallery

See also
List of National Historic Landmarks in West Virginia
National Register of Historic Places listings in Mingo County, West Virginia

References

External links
 Official Matewan, WV Website at Matewan.com
 Official Matewan, WV Tourism Website at VisitMatewan.com
 West Virginia Mine Wars Museum independent history museum covering the Mine Wars Era in Matewan, WV.

National Register of Historic Places in Mingo County, West Virginia
National Historic Landmarks in West Virginia
Historic districts in Mingo County, West Virginia
Neoclassical architecture in West Virginia
American Craftsman architecture in West Virginia
Bungalow architecture in West Virginia
Buildings designated early commercial in the National Register of Historic Places in West Virginia
Conflict sites on the National Register of Historic Places in West Virginia
Historic districts on the National Register of Historic Places in West Virginia